Heinrich Rohrer Medals are a series of awards presented to celebrate the late Nobel laureate Heinrich Rohrer for his work in the fields of nanoscience and nanotechnology, and specifically for co-creating the scanning tunneling microscope. Medals are awarded triennially by the Surface Science Society of Japan with IBM Research – Zurich, Swiss Embassy in Japan, and Ms. Rohrer. The Grand Medal is for a single researcher who has made "distinguished achievements in the field of nanoscience and nanotechnology based on surface science" but can be awarded to several individuals. The Rising Medal is presented to up to three researchers upwards of 37 years in age each with different topics. The Rising Medal is given for their outstanding efforts with the assumption that they will continue to actively work in their respective fields. Medals are given with a framed certificate and a cash prize of JPY 1,000,000 for the Grand Medal and JPY 300,000 for the Rising Medal.

Awards have been presented in 2014 and 2017 and is scheduled to be presented in November 2020 at the 9th International Symposium on Surface Science (ISSS9) in Takamatsu, Japan. The 2020 medals will be presented and laureates are requested to give award lectures at the upcoming ISSS9.

Laureates

Grand Medal

Rising Medal

See also
 Feynman Prize in Nanotechnology
 Kavli Prize
 List of physics awards

References

Awards established in 2013
Science and technology awards